Eigenmannia is a genus of fish in the family Sternopygidae (glass knifefishes) native to tropical and subtropical South America (south to the Río de la Plata Basin), and Panama. They are typically found in slow-flowing streams, along the edge of large rivers, in deep river channels and in floodplains, and the genus also includes E. vicentespelaea, the only cave-adapted knifefish. Eigenmannia are often found near submerged roots, aquatic plants and floating meadows.

They are nocturnal, and feed on small invertebrates such as aquatic insect larvae and zooplanktonic crustaceans.

Species
These are the currently recognized species in this genus:

 Eigenmannia antonioi L. A. W. Peixoto, Dutra & Wosiacki, 2015
 Eigenmannia besouro L. A. W. Peixoto & Wosiacki, 2016
 Eigenmannia bumba Dutra, Ramos & Menezes, 2022
 Eigenmannia cacuria Dutra, Ramos & Menezes, 2022 
 Eigenmannia correntes Campos-da-Paz & Queiroz, 2017
 Eigenmannia desantanai L. A. W. Peixoto, Dutra & Wosiacki, 2015
 Eigenmannia dutrai L. A. W. Peixoto, M. N. L. PASTANA, & Ballen, 2020
 Eigenmannia goajira L. P. Schultz, 1949
 Eigenmannia guairaca L. A. W. Peixoto, Dutra & Wosiacki, 2015
 Eigenmannia humboldtii (Steindachner, 1878)
 Eigenmannia limbata (Schreiner & A. Miranda-Ribeiro, 1903)
 Eigenmannia loretana Waltz & Albert, 2018
 Eigenmannia macrops (Boulenger, 1897)
 Eigenmannia matintapereira L. A. W. Peixoto, Dutra & Wosiacki, 2015
 Eigenmannia meeki Dutra, de Santana & Wosiacki, 2017
 Eigenmannia microstoma (J. T. Reinhardt, 1852)
 Eigenmannia muirapinima L. A. W. Peixoto, Dutra & Wosiacki, 2015
 Eigenmannia nigra Mago-Leccia, 1994
 Eigenmannia oradens Dutra, L. A. W. Peixoto, de Santana & Wosiacki, 2018
 Eigenmannia pavulagem L. A. W. Peixoto, Dutra & Wosiacki, 2015
 Eigenmannia robsoni Dutra, Ramos & Menezes, 2022
 Eigenmannia sayona L. A. W. Peixoto & Waltz, 2017
 Eigenmannia sirius L. A. W. Peixoto & Waltz, 2019
 Eigenmannia trilineata R. B. López & Castello, 1966
 Eigenmannia vicentespelaea Triques, 1996
 Eigenmannia virescens (Valenciennes, 1836)
 Eigenmannia waiwai L. A. W. Peixoto, Dutra & Wosiacki, 2015

References

Freshwater fish genera
Sternopygidae
Taxa named by David Starr Jordan
Taxa named by Barton Warren Evermann